Butere Constituency is an electoral constituency in Kenya. It is one of twelve constituencies in Kakamega County and one four in the former Butere/Mumias District. The constituency has six wards, all electing councillors to the Butere/Mumias County Council. The constituency was established for the 1963 elections.

Butere constituency Members of Parliament 

 2002 kenyan general lection 2002   tindi mwalle                               ANC

These are the Wards in Butere constituency[6]

References

Constituencies in Kakamega County
Constituencies of Western Province (Kenya)
1963 establishments in Kenya
Constituencies established in 1963